Joseph H. Albers D.D. (March 18, 1891 – December 1, 1965) was an American prelate of the Roman Catholic Church.  Albers served as the first bishop of the new Diocese of Lansing in Michigan in from 1937 until his death in 1964.  He served as an auxiliary bishop of the Archdiocese of Cincinnati in Ohio from 1929 until 1937.

Albers received a Silver Star for his service as a US Army chaplain in France during  World War I.

Biography

Early life 

Joseph Albers was born on March 18, 1891, in Cincinnati, Ohio.  He was educated at St. Francis Xavier College and Mount St. Mary College, both in Cincinnati.

Priesthood 
Albers was ordained a priest for the Archdiocese of Cincinnati by Archbishop Henry Moeller on June 17, 1916.  After his ordination, Albers served as an assistant pastor at Old St. Mary's Parish in Cincinnati.

After the outbreak of World War I, Albers join the US Army Chaplain Corps and was commissioned as an officer on June 1, 1918. He served in the infantry in France, seeing combat in the battles of the Argonne Forest, Chateau Thierry and St. Mihiel. Albers was wounded three times in battle and was a victim of a poison gas attack. He was decorated and received the Silver Star.

After being discharged from the Army in 1919, Albers returned to Cincinnati. He soon became assistant chancellor and assistant to the archbishop. In 1925, Alberts was appointed chancellor. In 1926 he became a monsignor. Albers studied canon law at Appollonaire University in Rome for two years, receiving a Doctor of Canon Law degree. Once back in Cincinnati, Albers resumed his post as chancellor.

Auxiliary Bishop of Cincinnati 
On December 16, 1929, Pope Pius XI appointed Albers as titular bishop of Lunda and as an auxiliary bishop of the Archdiocese of Cincinnati.  He was consecrated by Archbishop John Timothy McNicholas at Saint Peter in Chains Cathedral in Cincinnati on December 27, 1929.

Bishop of Lansing 
On May 26, 1937, Pope Pius XI appointed Alberts as the first bishop of the Diocese of Lansing.  He was consecrated on August 4, 1937, by Archbishop John Timothy McNicholas. In January 1938, the rectory of St. Mary Cathedral had a serious fire. Albers, still suffering from lungs weakened from poison gas in World War I, collapsed at the scene and was rescued by firefighters. In 1940, Albers moved into Meadowvue in Eaton Rapids, Michigan, his episcopal residence. He was appointed in 1954 as an assistant at the pontifical throne.

During Albers's episcopacy, the diocese built 38 parishes, 42 elementary schools and two high schools.  This earned Albers the appellation "The Builder". Albers enjoyed a special devotion to St. Joseph; one of the new parishes was named for him.  On August 1, 1954, the diocesan newsletter Catholic Weekly, Lansing began publication.  Albers was instrumental in its startup. On October 11, 1962, Albers attended the opening session of the Second Vatican Council.

Retirement and legacy
On October 7, 1964, Pope Paul VI accepted Albers's early retirement as bishop of the Diocese of Lansing due to bad health. He was succeeded by Bishop Alexander M. Zaleski.  Joseph Albers died in Lansing on December 1, 1965 at age 74. He was interred at  St. Joseph's Catholic Cemetery in Lansing.

The Knights of Columbus has a chapter named for him, the Bishop Joseph H. Albers Council 4090 in Davison, Michigan.  St. Joseph's Catholic Church was established in Battle Creek, Michigan in 1941.  To pay for the church, part of the grounds was subdivided and sold. That section is named "Bishop Albers Subdivision". The Bishop Joseph H. Albers Trust Fund provides scholarships to seminarians. Some of Albers's correspondence is stored in the University of Notre Dame archives.

References

External links

Catholic Telegraph Photography Project, photograph -- a scene from the life of Joseph H. Albers, 1934.  Historical photos from the files of The Catholic Telegraph, the official newspaper of the Archdiocese of Cincinnati.
State of Michigan statement of historical significance, Meadowvue Estate, Reuter, Irving and Janet, House 728 South Michigan Road, Eaton Rapids - Eaton County.
Joseph H. Albers headstone

1891 births
1965 deaths
Religious leaders from Ohio
Roman Catholic Archdiocese of Cincinnati
20th-century Roman Catholic bishops in the United States
Roman Catholic bishops of Lansing
People from Lansing, Michigan
Religious leaders from Cincinnati
Recipients of the Silver Star
Participants in the Second Vatican Council
United States Army chaplains
World War I chaplains
People from Eaton Rapids, Michigan
Military personnel from Michigan